In philately, the Higgins & Gage World Postal Stationery Catalog is the most recent encyclopedic catalogue of postal stationery covering the whole world.  Despite most volumes not having been updated for over thirty years, the catalogue and the H & G numbering system are still widely used by philatelists and stamp dealers although the values given in the catalogue are out of date.

The catalogue was published between 1964 and 1986 and comprises nineteen alphabetical volumes with supplements. The earlier volumes were edited by Edward Fladung who worked with Alexander D. Gage in the production of the catalogue. Later editions were edited by Melvin Feiner.

Publisher 
Originally published by Higgins & Gage Inc., the catalogue has now been acquired by Classic Philatelics of Huntington Beach, Pasadena, California. Classic Philatelics also produce a new issue postal stationery report.

Scope 
The postal stationery items which are included in the catalog are stamped envelopes, postal cards, lettercards, wrappers, aerograms and registration envelopes

List of volumes 
(Titles from most recent editions)

Vol.1 Abu Dhabi to Azores
Vol.2 Baden to Bushire
Vol.3 Cameroons to Czechoslovakia
Vol.4 Dahomey to Dutch New Guinea
Vol.5 East Africa to Ethiopia
Vol.6 Falkland Islands to Funchal
Vol.7 Gabon to Guyana
Vol.8 Haiti to Hungary
Vol.9 Iceland to Ivory Coast
Vol.10 Jamaica to Kuwait
Vol.11 Labuan to Luxemburg
Vol.12 Macao to Muscat
Vol.13 Natal to Orange River Colony
Vol.14 Pakistan to Queensland
Vol.15 Reunion Islands to Ryukyu Islands
Vol.16 Sarr to Syria
Vol.17 Tahiti to Turks & Caicos Islands
Vol.18 Ubangi to Uruguay
Vol.19 Vatican City to Zululand

References

Further reading 
"Some Observations on Higgins & Gage", in the Australasian Informer, August 1976.
"The Higgins and Gage Story, Wayne Menuz, originally published in the Journal of the Postal Stationery Society Issue No 4 (August 1994) and Issue No 5 (February 1995)

Postal stationery
Stamp catalogs